Adelino da Palma Carlos, GCC, GCIH, GOL (Faro, 3 May 1905 – Lisbon, 25 October 1992), was a Portuguese lawyer, scholar, politician and a freemason, one of at least five sons of Manuel Carlos and wife Auta Vaz Velho da Palma. He was an opponent of the fascist regime of the Estado Novo (New State) of António de Oliveira Salazar (and later Marcello Caetano) since his youth, and, being a liberal, rather than a socialist, was chosen by President António de Spínola, as the 103rd and the first prime minister after the 25 April 1974 revolution. He was also the 11th Bastonário of the Portuguese Bar Association.

His 1st Provisional Government was in power from 15 May to 17 July 1974. As an independent, he chose cabinet members from widely divergent political parties and positions, including members of the then center-left Popular Democratic Party, the Socialist Party and even the Portuguese Communist Party and the Armed Forces Movement (MFA) officers. The ideological diversity of the government seems to be one of the main reasons why the government didn't last, being the other the calling for anticipated presidential elections before Constituent Assembly election, 1975. He was replaced by Colonel Vasco Gonçalves, a choice that Spínola would later regret. After leaving office, Palma Carlos was the national representative (mandatário) of general António Ramalho Eanes for the 1980 Presidential Elections.

He was married to Elina Júlia Chaves Pereira Guimarães (Lisbon, 1904 – 1991).

References

1905 births
1992 deaths
People from Faro, Portugal
Portuguese anti-fascists
Prime Ministers of Portugal
Portuguese Freemasons
20th-century Portuguese lawyers
University of Lisbon alumni
Grand Crosses of the Order of Prince Henry
Union Internationale des Avocats